55 metres is a sprint event in track and field. It is a relatively uncommon non-championship event for indoor track and field. The history of the event lies in the 60-yard dash, which is about 5 inches shorter than 55 metres.  Since the 1960s almost all countries have used metric measurements for track and field, hence the standard sprint distances for indoor competition have been 50 metres and 60 metres.

The single exception to this was the United States, which continued to use imperial measurements. In the 1980s efforts were made to switch track and field in the United States to used metric measurements and the 55 metres was adopted as a close equivalent to 60 yards. The NCAA Indoor Championships featured the event from 1984 to 1998 and the USA Track & Field Indoor Championships featured the event from 1987–1990. Subsequently the 55 metres were dropped from American championships in favour of the international standard of 60 metres. Since the late 1990s there have been very few significant open competitions over 55 metres and the event remains something of a historic anomaly.  The distance is still frequently run in junior (below college) meets.

All-time top 25
Indoor results only.  Hand-timed results are excluded

The websites of World Athletics and tilastopaja.net are often used to generate lists of top performers.  However, the data in these sites is not complete before about 1998 and, as noted above, much of the championship activity in this event (and hence best performances) were before this time.  Hence a better source of data is the Track and Field News website.

A = affected by altitude

Men
Updated February 2023

Women
Updated February 2023

Season's bests

Men

Women

Notes

References

Events in track and field
Indoor track and field